Kavkaz may refer to:

 Caucasus region, for which Kavkaz is a local or historic name in several countries
 Port Kavkaz, a ferry port at Taman peninsula
 Port Kavkaz railway station, in Krasnodar Krai, Russia
 Kavkaz Center, a Chechen internet news agency

See also
 Tour of Kavkaz, a cycling race held annually in Russia
 Uralo-Kavkaz, an urban-type settlement in Krasnodon Municipality, Luhansk Oblast, Ukraine

Caucasus